Aleberry is a beverage made by boiling ale with spice (such as nutmeg), sugar and bread-sops, the last commonly toasted. It is sweetened, strained, and drunk hot.

The word is "a corruption of ale-bree ... bree (Anglo-Saxon brin, broth)."

Aleberry was often used as a domestic remedy for a cold.

See also

 Lamb's wool, a similar drink made with roasted apple 
 Posset, a hot drink of milk curdled with wine or ale
 List of hot beverages

References

External links 

Hot drinks
Fermented drinks
Traditional medicine